McDowell High School is a public high school located in Millcreek Township, Pennsylvania, a suburb of Erie. It is the only high school in the Millcreek Township School District. The school's mascot is the Trojan.

Students
There are approximately 2,500 students attending McDowell High School. The McDowell campus consists of two buildings: McDowell Intermediate accommodating students in grades 9 and 10, and McDowell Senior accommodating grades 11 and 12. Students travel between these buildings on campus when attending classes.

Enrollment

As of the 2015-16 school year:

Renovations
The Millcreek Township School Board has been in talks since 2009 for renovations to the McDowell property.  In December 2011, the school board announced four possible options for renovation, ranging in cost from $80 million to $100 million. The board has decided to create a new practice field for football.

On July 31, 2012, by a vote of 8-1, the Millcreek Township School Board voted in favor of consolidating both McDowell Senior High and McDowell Intermediate at cost of $110 million.  During the meeting, school board members voted 6-3 in favor of moving Gus Anderson Field to the east side of Caughey Road, despite major student complaints for air condition.

On February 7, 2013, the superintendent of Millcreek, Michael Golde, announced he was taking a medical leave and stepping down from his position.  One week later, the school board announced plans for a new McDowell were being scaled back, due to the high cost of the building.

In late February and early March, it was revealed the school district was between $6 million and $9 million in debt.  The final announced total was $8.8 million, as of April 12, 2013.  Due to the budget shortfall, the Millcreek Township School District announced the closure of two elementary schools, which officially ended the McDowell renovation project.

In March 2014, the Millcreek School Board approved nearly 2.4 million dollars to a renovation to the high school. There were renovations to the field, lockers and windows.

Notable alumni 

Dan Briggs, musician (Between the Buried and Me)
Marc Brown, author of Arthur television show
James Conner, All-American college football player and current NFL running back for Arizona Cardinals
Jim Corbett, NFL player
Travis Dermott, professional ice hockey player
Fernando Frye, College football player
David Greenberger, artist
 Mike Karns, Tony Award winning Broadway Producer 
William Kowalski, American-Canadian novelist and screenwriter
Katie Linendoll, TV host, speaker and journalist, focused on technology and gadgets
Connor McDavid, center and team captain for NHL's Edmonton Oilers
Pat Monahan, lead singer of Train
Mark Nelson, chemist and inventor of the antibiotic Nuzyra
Brian Stablein, former NFL receiver (Indianapolis Colts and Detroit Lions, 1994-2000)
Jonathan Stark, television writer/producer "Cheers", "Ellen, "Drew Carey", "According to Jim". Actor "Fright Night", "House II, The Second Story", "Tales of the Crypt".
Dylan Strome, professional ice hockey player
Chris Vrenna, musician (Tweaker, Nine Inch Nails, Marilyn Manson)

References

Educational institutions established in 1954
Public high schools in Pennsylvania
Schools in Erie County, Pennsylvania
1954 establishments in Pennsylvania